Matelea sintenisii, known commonly as the Sintenis' milkvine, is a species of plant in the family Apocynaceae. It is endemic to Puerto Rico, and is found in forests and moist districts.

References

sintenisii
Endemic flora of Puerto Rico
Flora without expected TNC conservation status